Scott Newton Schools is an American lawyer who currently serves as chief compliance officer of Uber. Before joining Uber, Schools was the highest-ranking career civil servant at the United States Department of Justice, serving as associate deputy attorney general. He has been characterized as “the most important unknown person in D.C.”

It has been reported that Schools was a significant advisor to top political officials Sally Yates and Rod Rosenstein, and made a significant recommendation to dismiss James Comey.

Earlier in his career, Schools had served as U.S. Attorney for South Carolina and U.S. Attorney for the Northern District of California.

In 2018, Schools was replaced by Bradley Weinsheimer, who now serves as DOJ's highest ranking career civil servant.

References 

Living people
Place of birth missing (living people)
20th-century American lawyers
21st-century American lawyers
United States Department of Justice lawyers
United States Attorneys for the District of South Carolina
United States Attorneys for the Northern District of California
Year of birth missing (living people)